In organic chemistry, paddlane is any member of a class of tricyclic saturated hydrocarbons having two bridgehead carbon atoms joined by four bridges. The name derives from a supposed resemblance of the molecule to a paddle wheel: namely, the rings would be the propeller's blades, and the shared carbon atoms would be its axis.

Systematically named tricyclo [m.n.o.p1,m+2]alkanes, these compounds have been referred to as [m.n.o.p]paddlanes. The notation [m.n.o.p]paddlane means the member of the family whose rings have m, n, o, and p carbons, not counting the two bridgeheads; or m + 2, n + 2, o + 2, and p + 2 carbons, counting them. The chemical formula is therefore C2+m+n+o+pH2(m+n+o+p). When p = 0, the compounds are propellanes.

Compounds 

The best known paddlane is [1.1.1.1]paddlane which can be seen as a precursor to octahedrane (C6), an allotrope of elemental carbon.

The American chemist Philip Eaton, famous for being the first to synthesize the "impossible" cubane molecule, has conducted studies for the synthesis of [2.2.2.2]paddlane.
The first mention of paddlane goes back to 1973.

References

See also 

Propellane
Fenestrane
Inverted tetrahedral geometry

Hydrocarbons
Tricyclic compounds